Route 350, commonly known as Botwood Highway, is a side highway in Central Newfoundland that leads from the Trans-Canada Highway (Route 1) in Bishop's Falls to Botwood, Point Leamington and Leading Tickles. Route 350-17 branches off in Point Leamington and connects the small community of Pleasantview to the main route. Route 350 continues on from Point Leamington for another 25 km north to Leading Tickles where the road officially ends. Along the way there is another short road connecting Glovers Harbour to the main route as well.

Route description

Route 350 begins in Bishop's Falls at an interchange with Route 1 (Trans-Canada Highway, Exit 22) just north of downtown. It heads northeast, paralleling the Exploits River, to pass through some neighbourhoods before leaving Bishop's Falls and passing through rural areas for several kilometres, where the road passes by the Exploits Valley (Botwood) Airport (Signed as Centra Newfoundland Airstrip). The highway begins following the coastline of the Bay of Exploits as it passes through Botwood, where it meets a local road leading to Peterview, and Northern Arm, where it makes a left turn at an intersection with Route 352 (Fortune Harbour Road). Route 350 now heads north through inland terrain for several kilometres to Point Leamington, where it meets a local road leading to Pleasantview before winding its through town. The highway winds its way northward through hilly terrain for several kilometres, where it meets a local road leading to Glovers Harbour, before entering Leading Tickles. Route 350 passes through some neighbourhoods before crossing a Causeway onto Cull Island and heading westward through the main part of town. Route 350 now comes to a dead end near the western tip of the island.

Major intersections

See also

List of Newfoundland and Labrador highways

References

350